The 2018 Big South Conference softball tournament was held at Radford University's Radford Softball Stadium from May 9 through May 12, 2018. As in the previous year, the tournament was a six-team field. Liberty won their third ever title, and received an automatic bid to the 2018 NCAA Division I softball tournament.

Seeds
The top two seeds, Liberty and Longwood, had byes to the second round. Teams were seeded by record within the conference, with a tiebreaker system to seed teams with identical conference records.

Tournament

All times listed are Eastern Daylight Time.

References

Big South Tournament
Big South Conference softball tournament